Dr. Vegas is an American drama television series created by  John Herzfeld and Jack Orman, starring Rob Lowe and Joe Pantoliano that ran on CBS from September 24, 2004 to October 29, 2004, being cancelled after five of the produced ten episodes aired. The complete series aired in Ireland on TG4, and on Challenge in the UK as part of its "Player" gambling strand.

The series co-starred Sarah Lancaster, Amy Adams, and Tom Sizemore. Chazz Palminteri filled in for Tom Sizemore when the actor re-entered rehab in 2004.

Broadcast of the ten-episode included a promotion prior to the end credits showing footage.

Cast
Rob Lowe as Dr. Billy Grant
Sarah Lancaster as Veronica Harold 
Joe Pantoliano as Tommy Canterna
Amy Adams as Alice Doherty 
Tom Sizemore as Vic Moore

Production
Dr. Vegas began a three-week shoot on April 5, 2004, at the Green Valley Ranch hotel and casino in Henderson, Nevada. Other filming locations included a casino penthouse and the Las Vegas Hilton's sign. A second unit film crew shot additional scenes of Las Vegas in August 2004.

Episodes

References

External links
 

2004 American television series debuts
2004 American television series endings
2000s American medical television series
2000s American drama television series
Television series by Warner Bros. Television Studios
Television shows set in the Las Vegas Valley
English-language television shows
CBS original programming